Daniel Michael Andrews (born 6 July 1972) is an Australian politician serving as the 48th and current premier of Victoria since December 2014. He has been the leader of the Victorian branch of the Australian Labor Party (ALP) since December 2010 and a member of the Legislative Assembly (MLA) for the division of Mulgrave since 2002. 

Andrews initially worked as a research and political officer for the Labor Party, before being elected to the Victorian Legislative Assembly at the 2002 election for the seat of Mulgrave. In 2006 he was appointed to the Ministry by Premier Steve Bracks, serving as the Minister for Consumer Affairs, before being promoted by Premier John Brumby in 2007 to Minister for Health. After the defeat of Brumby at the 2010 election by Ted Baillieu, Andrews was elected as the Leader of the Labor Party in Victoria, becoming Leader of the Opposition in the Legislative Assembly.

In November 2014, after serving only one term in opposition, Andrews led Labor to victory at the 2014 election; he was sworn in as Premier of Victoria by Governor Alex Chernov on 4 December. He led Labor to a landslide second victory at the 2018 election, increasing the party's majority by 10 seats in the Legislative Assembly, and to a third landslide victory at the 2022 election increasing the party's significant majority in the Legislative Assembly. Major challenges to the premiership of Andrews have included the 2019–20 Australian bushfire season and the COVID-19 pandemic.

Andrews is widely considered a figurehead of progressive politics in Victoria and Australia. Political commentators have remarked that he is the “dominant political figure of his generation”, which has been characterised by his progressive social policies and reformism.

Early life 
Andrews was born in Williamstown, a southwestern suburb of Melbourne, to Bob (1950–2016) and Jan Andrews (born 1944). In 1983, his family moved from Glenroy to Wangaratta in northeastern Victoria, where he was educated at the Marist Brothers' Galen Catholic College. Andrews moved back to Melbourne in 1990 to attend Monash University, where he was a resident of Mannix College and graduated with a Bachelor of Arts degree in politics and classics in 1996.  After graduating, Andrews became an electorate officer for federal Labor MP Alan Griffin. He worked at the party's head office from 1999 to 2002, initially as an organiser, and then as assistant state secretary. Andrews is a member of the Socialist Left faction of the Labor Party.

Political career

Bracks Government (2002–2007) 
Following his election to parliament in the Legislative Assembly seat of Mulgrave at the 2002 election, Andrews was appointed Parliamentary Secretary for Health in the Steve Bracks Labor government. Following the 2006 election, Andrews was appointed to the Cabinet, becoming Minister for Gaming, Minister for Consumer Affairs, and Minister Assisting the Premier on Multicultural Affairs.

Andrews is one of the few state politicians in Australia to have never spent a day on the backbench. He has spent his entire tenure in the Legislative Assembly as a junior minister (2002–2006), minister (2006–2010), opposition leader (2010–2014), and premier (2014–present).

Brumby Government (2007–2010) 

In 2007, Andrews became Minister for Health in the John Brumby Labor government.
In 2008, Andrews voted in favour of abortion law reform in Victoria. As Health Minister during the passing of the Abortion Law Reform Act 2008, Andrews sought counsel from senior church clergy who advised him that the act was contrary to Church teaching. Andrews replied that he "... did not intend to be a Catholic health minister. It was my intention to be a Victorian health minister".

Opposition (2010–2014) 
Brumby resigned as leader of the Victorian Labor Party following the Labor defeat at the 2010 election, after 11 years of Labor governments. On 3 December 2010, Andrews was elected Victorian Labor Party leader, becoming Leader of the Opposition in Victoria, with former Deputy Premier Rob Hulls staying on as his deputy. Hulls resigned in early 2012 and was replaced as deputy by James Merlino.

Labor took the lead in the polls in mid-2012 and held it for all but a few months until the election, though Andrews consistently trailed his Liberal counterparts, Ted Baillieu (2010–2013) and Denis Napthine (2013–2014) as preferred premier.

Premier of Victoria (2014–present)

2014 state election
Labor held 43 seats at dissolution but notionally held 40 after the redistribution of electoral boundaries.  It thus needed a swing to win five seats to form government. At the election, Labor gained seven seats for a total of 47, a majority of two. The election was the first time since 1955 that an incumbent government was removed from office after a single term.

In his victory speech, Andrews declared, "The people of Victoria have today given to us the greatest of gifts, entrusted to us the greatest of responsibilities, and bestowed upon us the greatest of honours. We will not let them down!" He was sworn in as premier on 4 December.

First term (2014–2018)

On winning office, Andrews government cancelled the East West Link project and initiated the level crossing removal project and the Melbourne Metro Rail Project.

On 24 May 2016 Andrews made an official apology in parliament for gay men in Victoria punished during the time homosexuality was a crime in the state. It was decriminalised in 1981.

In August 2018 Andrews announced plans to build a $50 billion suburban rail loop connecting all major rail lines via Melbourne Airport.

Ending ambulance dispute
Shortly after his taking office in 2014 Daniel Andrews ended the state government's dispute with ambulance paramedics. The dispute that had started with the previous state government did not go as far as strikes, due to the death toll that would result in such action. So the visible manifestation of the dispute was the protest-style "colourful slogans" on the side and back windows of the state's ambulances, which were removed after Andrews promised to end the dispute.

China
Upon his election, Andrews fast-tracked Victoria's ties with the PRC. Firstly, he led a group of prominent Victorians to China on his first overseas trip and promised to send his entire cabinet there during his first term.  Eyeing the enormous opportunities with tourism, education and investment, his government signed a memorandum of understanding (MoU) with the Chinese government under the Belt and Road Initiative in October 2018, but kept its details secret until he released it five weeks later. The MoU involves cooperation on facilities connectivity, unimpeded trade, finance, people-to-people bond[s], and the "Digital Silkroad". Cooperation will be in the form of "dialogue, joint research, pilot programs, knowledge sharing, and capacity building". Andrews said that the MoU "does not bind Victoria to be involved in any specific project or initiative" and "the government will consider both the Victorian and national interest before agreeing to be involved in any specific activity".

On 21 April 2021, the Commonwealth Government used its veto powers to cancel the agreements made between Victoria and China under the Belt and Road Initiative.

Port of Melbourne lease
In September 2016, the Andrews Government privatised the Port of Melbourne for a term of 50 years in return for more than $9.7 billion.

Euthanasia
On 20 September 2017, the Voluntary Assisted Dying Bill 2017 was introduced into the Legislative Assembly of the Victorian Parliament by the Andrews Labor Government. The bill is modelled on the recommendations of an expert panel chaired by former Australian Medical Association president Professor Brian Owler. The proposed legislation was said by proponents to be the most conservative in the world and contain 68 safeguards including measures designed to protect vulnerable people from coercion and abuse, as well as a board to review each case. Labor and Coalition MPs were allowed a conscience vote on the Bill. The bill was debated in the lower house over three sitting days, passing the Assembly without amendment on 20 October 2017 after an emotional and tense debate which lasted more than 24 hours. The bill was passed by 47 votes to 37. The Bill finally passed through parliament, with amendments made in the Victorian Legislative Council, on 29 November 2017. In passing the bill, Victoria became the first state to legislate for voluntary assisted dying. The law received royal assent on 5 December 2017, and came into effect on 19 June 2019.

2018 state election 

At the November 2018 state election, Labor won a comprehensive victory, picking up an eight-seat swing for a total of 55 seats, tying Labor's second-best seat count in Victoria. The party recorded substantial swings in Melbourne's eastern suburbs; as the ABC's election analyst Antony Green put it, eastern Melbourne was swept up in a "band of red". Labor also took a number of seats in areas considered Liberal heartland, including Baillieu's former seat of Hawthorn. It is only the fifth time that a Labor government has been reelected in Victoria.

Second term (2018–2022) 
In 2019, an independent tribunal granted Andrews an 11.8% salary increase, giving him a total salary of $441,000 and making him the highest-paid state premier in the country.

Andrews received praise for his leadership during the 2019–20 Victorian bushfires. Andrews faced criticism and praise from various groups for his response to the COVID-19 pandemic in Victoria.

Since the retirement of Tasmanian premier Will Hodgman in January 2020, Andrews has been the longest-serving incumbent state premier in Australia.

Privatisation
In 2018, The Andrews government oversaw the Privatisation of the Land Titles and Registry office for $2.8 billion.   

On 2022, The Andrews government oversaw the VicRoads part of registration and licensing privatised.

COVID-19 pandemic

During his second term, Andrews led the State's response to the COVID-19 pandemic.

In late June 2020, cases began to rise primarily originating from breaches in hotel quarantine. On 20 June, with the state recording 25 cases, Andrews mostly delayed the planned easing of restrictions and reinstated stricter home gathering rules. On 30 June, with the state recording 64 new infections, Andrews announced stage 3 restrictions for 10 postcodes within metropolitan Melbourne, suspended international flights and announced a judicial inquiry into the state's hotel quarantine program. Andrews announced a further two postcodes would return to stage 3 restrictions and a 'hard lockdown' of public housing towers in North Melbourne and Kensington on 4 July. The Ombudsman later criticised the timing and conduct of the lockdown as potentially violating the residents' charter rights
. On 7 July, Andrews announced the reimposition of stage 3 restrictions for metropolitan Melbourne and Mitchell Shire as the state recorded 191 new cases. Under these restrictions, residents in the affected area could only leave the home for exercise, obtaining supplies, work if it couldn't be done from home and to provide care and compassion.

In early August 2020, following a spike in COVID-19 infections in Victoria with up to 750 new infections detected per day, Andrews declared a State of Disaster and announced Stage 4 lockdown rules for 31 metropolitan Melbourne municipalities and Stage 3 rules for regional parts of the state. The Stage 4 rules for Melbourne included compulsory face masks, all but essential businesses closed, residents only being allowed to leave their homes once a day to shop for essential items only, and once a day to exercise for a maximum of one hour. Both these activities were restricted to within five kilometres of home. All schooling was to be done remotely using electronic communication. A nightly curfew from 8 pm to 5 am was introduced. Exemptions existed for workers deemed essential.

The restrictions correlated with a reduction in the rate of infections, such that by mid-September 2020 the 14-day case average was 44.4 rather than 63 predicted by the modelling done when they were introduced. Restrictions began to ease from that time.

On 26 October 2020, Victoria recorded no new cases and no new deaths, its first day of no cases since early June. The achievement was called "Donut Day".

In 2021, further COVID-19 outbreaks in Victoria led to lockdowns being reinstated a further four times, with restrictions including a 9:00 pm–5:00 am curfew and 5 km travel limit reinstated for residents of metropolitan Melbourne.

In October 2021, Andrews was fined $400 for breaching face mask rules on two occasions, in both cases he walked through a car park at Parliament House to his press conference without wearing a mask.

IBAC investigation
In July 2022, IBAC, in collaboration with the Victorian Ombudsman, handed down their final report of Operation Watts, their investigation into allegations of misuse of electorate office and ministerial office staff and resources for branch stacking and other party-related activities by members of the Labor Party's Victorian branch.

Among other things, the report found that "unethical practices are embedded in the Victorian branch of the ALP and are systemic to all of the ALP's factions" and "that these practices have been approved or condoned by the party leadership for decades". Shortly after, IBAC Commissioner, The Hon Robert Redlich , confirmed that in saying "party leadership", he included Daniel Andrews and that Andrews, at a minimum, was aware of the conduct outlined in the investigation.

2022 state election 

Andrews led the Victorian Labor Party to a further emphatic victory over the Liberal party at the 2022 election, securing a third term as Premier and for the Labor Party. Despite heavy swings against the party in some Northern and Western suburb electorates, the party increased its majority with a net gain of 1 seat, according to ABC News. Many Eastern suburbs seats which were unexpectedly won in the landslide result of 2018 increased their margins for Labor, and the party also gained the electoral districts of Glen Waverley, Hastings and Ripon from incumbent Liberal MPs, and also retained the electoral districts of Bayswater and Bass which became notionally Liberal after the redistribution.

Andrews also easily withstood an Independent challenger, Ian Cook, in his electorate of Mulgrave, winning more than 50% of the primary votes in the electorate.

Andrews will become the longest-serving Labor Premier in Victoria's history in April 2023, overtaking John Cain Jr, who served as Premier from 1982 to 1990.

Third term (2022–present) 
Andrews has pledged to re-establish the state-owned State Electricity Commission, remove a total of 110 Level Crossings, establish free kindergarten and commence construction on the Suburban Rail Loop (SRL) and SRL Airport Line during his third term.

Public opinion 
In April 2020, 77% approved of Andrews' handling of the coronavirus pandemic; this was the third highest figure out of all of Australia's premiers. Andrews' approval ratings dropped due to the acceleration of Victoria's second wave of infections and harsh restrictions aimed at suppressing the spread of infections. A September 2020 Roy Morgan Research poll showed that 70% approved of the way Andrews was handling his job as Premier of Victoria, and a September 2020 Newspoll showed that 62% agreed that Andrews handled Victoria's COVID-19 response well. In November 2020, a Roy Morgan Research showed that Andrews' approval rating had increased by 9%, with 71% of Victorian electors approving of his handling of his job. By the time of the 2022 state election, Andrews' approval ratings had declined, but still remained relatively high, and he consistently led Opposition Leader Matthew Guy in opinion polling throughout his term.

Media coverage 
During the early years of the COVID-19 pandemic, conservative commentators criticised the Andrews' government for its introduction of vaccination mandates, prolonged lockdowns and failures in hotel quarantine in 2020. Conservative-leaning media outlets, in particular those owned by News Corp Australia, gave Andrews the label "Dictator Dan" because of the strict measures his government took to suppress the spread of COVID-19. His popularity remained high and the daily media conferences he gave to explain his position and reasoning were a television ratings hit. Several media outlets and commentators have accused News Corp of biased reporting against Andrews, including former prime minister Kevin Rudd.

Political positions
Andrews has been a member of Labor's socialist left faction since he joined the party in 1993. Having been an advocate for environmentalism and climate change, he supported the pledge for net zero emissions by 2050, and has started plans to renationalise the state electricity grid following the 2022 state election. Andrews has furthermore been a long time republican, and supports abolishing Australia's constitutional monarchy in favour of a federal republic.

Andrews has voiced support throughout his career for same sex marriage, the protection and expansion of LGBT rights and the promotion of awareness and respect for transgender and transitioning people, particularly amongst young victorians. On 24 May 2016, Andrews issued a formal apology on behalf of the Victorian Government, to the LGBT community, and specifically members of the community who had been charged with homosexual offences and crimes in the state prior to the decriminalisation of homosexuality in 1981. Premier Andrews said in a speech to the Victorian Parliament: 

Andrews, who is Catholic himself, has also been an outspoken critic of the Catholic Church in Australia, for their failure to adequately respond to extensive issues relating to child sexual abuse. On the death of Australia's most senior Catholic, Cardinal George Pell, Andrews remarked that his government would make no offer for a state funeral and instead made the following statement: “For victim-survivors, [I want] to send the clearest possible message: We see you, we believe you, we support you and you’re at the centre of not only our thoughts, not only our words, but our actions"Andrews has somewhat conservative views towards illicit drugs, being against the decriminalisation of recreational marijuana and against pill testing at music festivals.

Personal life
Andrews married Catherine Kesik in 1998 and they now live in Mulgrave with their three children. Andrews had a Roman Catholic upbringing but his attachment to it has waned since and he rarely attends church.

On the morning of 9 March 2021, Andrews slipped and fell on wet steps while on holiday on the Mornington Peninsula. He was taken to hospital where he was placed under intensive care. He suffered several broken ribs and a broken vertebra from the fall but did not have any head injuries. Deputy Premier James Merlino was the Acting Premier until Andrews returned on 28 June 2021.

On 28 March 2022, it was reported that Andrews contracted COVID-19, he later made a full recovery and continued to carry out his duties from isolation.

Andrews is a supporter of the Essendon Football Club.

References

External links

 Premier of Victoria official government website
 Dan Andrews official website
 Member profile at the Parliament of Victoria
 Parliamentary voting record of Daniel Andrews at Victorian Parliament Tracker

|-

|-

|-

|-

1972 births
Living people
Premiers of Victoria
Members of the Victorian Legislative Assembly
Leaders of the Opposition in Victoria (Australia)
Australian Labor Party members of the Parliament of Victoria
Monash University alumni
Politicians from Melbourne
People from Williamstown, Victoria
Australian Roman Catholics
Labor Left politicians
21st-century Australian politicians
People from Mulgrave, Victoria